Gisselle Ortiz Cáceres, known simply as Gisselle (born March 28, 1969 in New York City, U.S.) is an American Merengue singer of Puerto Rican descent.

Biography

Musical career
Gisselle was born in New York City to Puerto Rican parents. She showed interest in the arts from an early age and started dancing at the Ita Medina Academy when she was 15 years old. She participated as a dancer in several shows in venues like the Luis A. Ferré Performing Arts Center.

It was then that she started to incline towards a career in music. She joined Kaviar, a merengue group composed of females, with whom she performed for almost two years. From 1991 to 1993, she performed with the group Punto G. After that, she decided to pursue a solo career and was signed by the BMG label.

In 1995, Bonny Cepeda produced her first album that produced several hit singles like "Perfume de mujer en tu camisa" and "Pesadilla". It was also awarded gold and platinum albums, and several awards.

In 1996, her second album -  - was released to much praise. The album reached 200,000 units sold. Her third album, was equally successful reaching the top places on the Billboard charts. The album featured a version of Juan Gabriel's song  in a duet with Dominican Sergio Vargas which was very successful. After, they released an album together titled .

In the late 90s, Gisselle released the album  which garnered her a Grammy nomination. Her follow-up, released in 2000, featured Gisselle singing ballads and bachatas. In 2002, she received another Grammy nomination for her album titled simply 8.

Gisselle's next album, featured the singer venturing into pop music. However, in 2004 she returned to merengue with her new album .

Discography

Acting career

In 2001, she starred in the play .

Recently, she appeared in the play , with Gilberto Santa Rosa and Yolandita Monge.

Radio host
In 2007, Gisselle was invited to host the morning radio show  at SalSoul. After a couple of months, she changed shifts hosting  at the same station. Now she has a has radio show called: "El Show de Giselle y Jesse" with Jesse Calderon.

Personal life
Gisselle was married in the early 1990s and has a son, Viadel, from that relationship. Viadel was born in 1994. Gisselle also has a brother named Miguel A Ortiz Caceres and lives in Hartford, CT. After her divorce she has had relationships with model and actor Julian Gil, and baseball player Roberto Alomar.

 In 2009 she married minor league baseball player, Miguel “Mickey” Negron. They divorced in 2021. No children were conceived from their union.

References

1970 births
Living people
American people of Puerto Rican descent
American women pop singers
Merengue musicians
Latin pop singers
20th-century Puerto Rican women singers
21st-century Puerto Rican women singers
Women in Latin music